The Workshop for Armenian/Turkish Scholarship (WATS) is a group of scholars which is dedicated to transcending the nationalist historiography on the Armenian genocide and answering related questions. It first met in 2000. The workshop and the book it published (edited by Ronald Grigor Suny, Fatma Müge Göçek, and Norman Naimark) were widely praised as first-class scholarship that significantly advanced the field. According to the workshop organizers, Turkish participants have faced state harassment for their participation.

Works

References

2000 establishments in Michigan
Historiography of the Armenian genocide
Academic organizations based in the United States